William Calow (died 1487) was an English justice. He was educated at Middle Temple and was made a Serjeant-at-Law in 1479. On 31 January 1487 he became Fourth Justice of the Court of Common Pleas, but died later that year.

References

Members of the Middle Temple
Serjeants-at-law (England)
15th-century births
1487 deaths
15th-century English judges
People of the Tudor period